Cryphops is an extinct genus of trilobite in the family Phacopidae. There are at least three described species in Cryphops.

Species
These three species belong to the genus Cryphops:
 † Cryphops cryphoides
 † Cryphops cryptophthalmus
 † Cryphops tripartitus

References

Phacopidae
Articles created by Qbugbot